The vomeronasal cartilage (or Jacobson's cartilage) is a narrow strip of cartilage, low on the medial wall of the nasal cavity. It lies between the septal nasal cartilage and the vomer. The cartilage lies below, but is not connected to, the rudimentary vomeronasal organ.

Ludwig Lewin Jacobson (1783–1843), a Danish anatomist, named this structure in 1809.

References

External links
 jacobson's cartilage

Nose